KNHT (102.5 FM) is a radio station licensed to Rio Dell, California. The station is owned by Southern Oregon University, and is an affiliate of Jefferson Public Radio, airing JPR's "Classics & News" service, consisting of news and classical music programming.

External links
ijpr.org

NHT
Classical music radio stations in the United States
NPR member stations
Radio stations established in 1999
1999 establishments in California
Southern Oregon University